Ibrahim Sadiq (born 7 May 2000) is a Ghanaian professional footballer who plays as a winger for BK Häcken in the Swedish Allsvenskan.

Early life 
Sadiq was with the Right to Dream Academy before moving to Europe.

Club career
Sadiq made his unofficial debut for FC Nordsjælland on 4 July 2018 in a friendly match against the Belgian team KFCO Beerschot Wilrijk. He scored a goal after 72 minutes, leading to a 3–2 win. Sadiq made his official debut in the Danish Superliga for Nordjsælland on 15 July 2018 when he appeared as a 73rd minute substitute in a 1–0 win over Esbjerg fB. On 19 July, he made his debut in the UEFA Europa League in the 2–1 home win over Cliftonville.

On 18 February 2022, Sadiq signed a contract with BK Häcken in Sweden until the end of 2025.

International career
Sadiq played at the 2017 FIFA U-17 World Cup scoring the match winner and earning the Man of the Match in Ghana's opening day victory against Colombia.

Honours 
BK Häcken

 Allsvenskan: 2022

References

External links

Living people
2000 births
Ghanaian footballers
Association football forwards
Association football wingers
FC Nordsjælland players
BK Häcken players
Danish Superliga players
Ghanaian expatriate footballers
Expatriate men's footballers in Denmark
Ghanaian expatriate sportspeople in Denmark
Expatriate footballers in Sweden
Ghanaian expatriate sportspeople in Sweden
Ghana under-20 international footballers
Ghana youth international footballers